Virtual Labs may refer to:

Virtual Labs (India), a project of India's Ministry of Human Resource Development
Remote laboratory 
Virtual Lab, a Japanese puzzle game